Daniel Waters (born March 14, 1969) is an American author of young adult novels. He lives in Connecticut with his wife and children.

Published works
Generation Dead (Hyperion, 2008) According to WorldCat, the book is held in 1275 libraries  
Translated into Spanish as Generación dead
Generation Dead: Kiss of Life (Hyperion, 2009) According to WorldCat, the book is held in 2511http://www.worldcat.org/oclc/262883826 libraries  
Translated into Spanish as Beso de vida
Generation Dead: Passing Strange (Hyperion, 2010)
Translated into Spanish as Extran̋as apariencias
Generation Dead: Stitches (Hyperion, 2011)
Break My Heart 1,000 Times (Hyperion, 2012).  The film I Still See You  (2018) is based upon this novel.

References

External links
Daniel Waters

1969 births
Living people
Writers from Connecticut
American writers of young adult literature